Three weeks in the life of Prime Minister Nehru is a 1962 Indian documentary film based on Jawaharlal Nehru, directed by Ezra Mir.

See also
Tryst with Destiny (1947 speech)
The light has gone out of our lives (1948 speech)
Our Prime Minister (1957 film)
Nehru (1984 film)

References

External links

1957 films
1950s English-language films
1950s short documentary films
Indian short documentary films
Cultural depictions of Jawaharlal Nehru
Cultural depictions of prime ministers of India
Films directed by Shyam Benegal
Indian biographical films
Indian political films
History of India on film